Juliane of Hesse-Philippsthal (8 June 1761 – 9 November 1799), was a countess of Schaumburg-Lippe, married in 1780 to Count Philip II, Count of Schaumburg-Lippe. She served as the regent of Schaumburg-Lippe during the minority of her son from 1787 to 1799.

Life 
Juliane was the daughter of Landgrave William of Hesse-Philippsthal (1726–1810) and his wife Ulrike Eleonore, Landgravine of Hesse-Philippsthal-Barchfeld (1732–1795). She spent some of her youth in 's-Hertogenbosch, where her father served as a Dutch general.  She received a German education.

On 10 October 1780 she married in Philippsthal to Count Philip Ernest of Schaumburg-Lippe.  Philipp Ernst, who was 57 years old  at the time and already a widower, died after only seven years of marriage.  Countess Juliane took up government, together with Count Johann Ludwig, Reichsgraf von Wallmoden-Gimborn as regent for her minor son George William.  Immediately afterwards, Landgrave William of Hesse-Kassel occupied Schaumburg-Lippe militarily, arguing it was a fief of Hesse, and vacant after Philip II's death.  With support from Hanover, Prussia and the Imperial Council, Juliane managed to achieve a rapid withdrawal of the Hessian troops.

The Government of Juliane is considered extremely beneficial.  She conducted thorough reforms of the economy and education, downsized the court, continued the tolerant policy towards the Jews her father-in-law had introduced and managed to cut taxes.  She appointed Bernhard Christoph Faust as her personal physician, and helped him significantly with the introduction of the smallpox inoculation.

Juliane initiated a redesign of Hagenburg Castle and she is considered the founder of the spa Bad Eilsen.

She died after a severe cold and was buried in a mausoleum in the Schaumburg Forest.  Count von Wallmoden-Gimborn continued to act as a regent for her son.

Issue 
Countess Eleonore Luise (1781–1783)
Countess Wilhelmine Charlotte (1783–1858)
Count Georg Wilhelm (1784–1860)
Countess Karoline Luise (1786–1846)

Ancestors

References 

 Otto Zaretzky: Juliane (Gräfin zu Schaumburg-Lippe). In: Allgemeine Deutsche Biographie (ADB). Band 55, Duncker & Humblot, Leipzig 1910, S. 810–813.
 Horst-Rüdiger Jarck: Juliane Wilhelmine Luise, Gräfin zu Schaumburg-Lippe. In: Neue Deutsche Biographie (NDB). Band 10, Duncker & Humblot, Berlin 1974, S. 653 f. 

1761 births
1799 deaths
18th-century German people
German countesses
18th-century women rulers
Daughters of monarchs